Intissar al-Wazir (1941-) (also known as Umm Jihad أم جهاد) is a member of the Palestinian Legislative Council and a former PNA minister. Her husband was Khalil al-Wazir, a senior figure of the Palestine Liberation Organization who was assassinated by Israel in 1988. She joined the Fatah organization in 1959, becoming the party’s first female member. She has a bachelor's degree in history from Damascus University.

Biography
Al-Wazir was born in Gaza City. She helped found the General Union of Palestinian Women, an organization that focuses on the social, economic and legal status of Palestinian women.

She has been a member of the Palestinian National Council since 1974 and a member of the Fatah-Central Committee since 1987. She was the Secretary-General of the General Union of Palestinian Women from 1980–85. In 1983, she served as the Deputy Secretary-General of the Fatah-Revolutionary Council. During Khalil al-wazir (Abu Jihad's) exile, Intissar lived with him for 30 years although she was not under exile. She returned to the Gaza Strip in 1995 and was elected to the PLC in 1996. From 1995 to 2005 she was Social Affairs Minister of the Palestinian National Authority.

Sources and external links
 Palestinian National Authority: Biography of PA Cabinet Intisar al-Wazir - Minister of Social Affairs
 Intisar al-Wazir
 Statement by Mrs. Intisar al-Wazir Minister of Social Affairs Palestinian National Authority

   

1941 births
Living people
Fatah members
People from Gaza City
Palestine Liberation Organization members
Government ministers of the Palestinian National Authority
Palestinian women in politics
Members of the 2006 Palestinian Legislative Council
Members of the 1996 Palestinian Legislative Council
Women government ministers of the Palestinian National Authority
Central Committee of Fatah members